Trinity Seven is a fantasy romantic comedy manga series by Kenji Saitō with art by Akinari Nao. The series has been serialized in Fujimi Shobo's shōnen manga magazine Monthly Dragon Age since 2010. The first complied volume was released on July 7, 2011.  On October 10, 2014, Yen Press announced at their New York Comic Con panel that they licensed Trinity Seven for release in North America, with the first volume releasing on May 19, 2015.

A spin-off manga written by Saito and illustrated by Sutarō Hanao, titled , launched in Dragon Age on November 9, 2015, and ended on December 9, 2016. Chako Abeno launched a second spin-off, titled , in Dragon Age on February 9, 2017.  The manga ended on June 9, 2018.



Volume list

Trinity Seven

Trinity Seven: Levi Ninden

Trinity Seven: Liese Chronicle

Trinity Seven: Seven Days

Trinity Seven: RPG

References

Trinity Seven